Brigadier Theodore Delves Broughton (1872–1944) was a senior British Army officer during the First World War.

Biography
Born on 25 December 1872, Theodore Delves Broughton was educated at Bedford School. He served during the First World War, between 1914 and 1918, fighting in Mesopotamia and Persia, and was promoted to the rank of Brigadier. He served during the Malabar Rebellion, between 1921 and 1922, and was Chief Engineer of India, between 1925 and 1929.

Brigadier Theodore Delves Broughton died in Pewsey, Wiltshire, on 1 February 1944.

References

1872 births
1944 deaths
People educated at Bedford School
British Army personnel of World War I
British Army brigadiers